The learnable evolution model (LEM) is a non-Darwinian methodology for evolutionary computation that employs machine learning to guide the generation of new individuals (candidate problem solutions). Unlike standard, Darwinian-type evolutionary computation methods that use random or semi-random operators for generating new individuals (such as mutations and/or recombinations), LEM employs hypothesis generation and instantiation operators.
 
The hypothesis generation operator applies a machine learning program to induce descriptions that distinguish between high-fitness and low-fitness individuals in each consecutive population.  Such descriptions delineate areas in the search space that most likely contain the desirable solutions. Subsequently the instantiation operator samples these areas to create new individuals.
LEM has been modified from optimization domain to classification domain by augmented LEM with ID3 (February 2013 by M. Elemam Shehab, K. Badran, M. Zaki and Gouda I. Salama).

Selected references 
 

Evolutionary computation